A lid is a cover or seal for a container.

Lid or LID may also refer to:

Business and organizations
 League for Industrial Democracy, a political party
 Left and Democrats (Lewica i Demokraci), a former electoral alliance in Poland
 Alidaunia, an Italian airline (ICAO code: LID)

People with the surname
 Dagny Tande Lid (1901–1998), Norwegian painter, illustrator and poet
 Glenn D. Lid (born 1957), American educator
 Hilde Synnøve Lid (born 1971), Norwegian freestyle skier
 Johannes Lid (1886–1971), Norwegian botanist
 Mons Lid (1896–1967), Norwegian politician
 Tore Vagn Lid (born 1973),  Norwegian theatre director, playwright, musician, and artistic director
 Olav Lid (1908–1998), Norwegian jurist

Science and technology
 Light-weight Identity, an identity management system for online digital identities
 Lithium deuteride (6LiD), a fusion fuel in thermonuclear weapons

Other uses
 Eyelid
 Freeway lid, a type of deck bridge built on top of a controlled-access highway
 Khirbat Lid, a depopulated Palestinian village 
 Light Infantry Division, of the Myanmar Army
 Location identifier, in aviation
 Latent iron deficiency, a medical condition
 Low-impact development (U.S. and Canada), a term in land planning 
 Low-impact development (UK), a term in land planning 
 Nyindrou language, ISO 639-3 language code: lid
 Love Is Dead, a studio album by Chvrches

See also
 Lids (disambiguation)
 IID (disambiguation)
 Beit Lid, a Palestinian town in the West Bank
 Khirbat Bayt Lid, a depopulated Palestinian village